Poretsky District  (Păraçkav rayonĕ) is an administrative and municipal district (raion), one of the twenty-one in the Chuvash Republic, Russia. It is located in the southwest of the republic. Its administrative center is the rural locality (a selo) of Poretskoye. Population:  17,311 (2002 Census);  The population of Poretskoye accounts for 41.6% of the district's total population.

References

Notes

Sources

Districts of Chuvashia